Eyewire is a citizen science game from Sebastian Seung's Lab at Princeton University. It is a human-based computation game that uses players to map retinal neurons. Eyewire launched on December 10, 2012. The game utilizes data generated by the Max Planck Institute for Medical Research.

Eyewire gameplay aims to advance neuroscience by enabling the reconstruction of morphological neuron data, which helps researchers model information processing circuits.

Gameplay
The player is given a cube with a partially reconstructed neuron branch stretching through it. The player completes the reconstruction by coloring a 2D image with a 3D image generated simultaneously. Reconstructions are compared across players as each cube is submitted, yielding a consensus reconstruction that is later checked by experienced players.

Goal
Eyewire aims to advance the use of artificial intelligence in neuronal reconstruction. The project aims to help determine how mammals see directional motion.

Methods
The activity of each neuron in a 350 × 300 × 60 μm3 portion of a retina was determined by two-photon microscopy. Using serial block-face scanning electron microscopy, the same volume was stained to bring out the contrast of the plasma membranes, sliced into layers by a microtome, and imaged using an electron microscope.

A neuron is selected by the researchers. The program chooses a cubic volume associated with that neuron for the player, along with an artificial intelligence's best guess for tracing the neuron through the two-dimensional images.

Publications

Accomplishments
 Eyewire neurons featured at 2014 TED Conference Virtual Reality Exhibit.
 Eyewire neurons featured at US Science and Engineering Expo in Washington, DC.
 Eyewire won the National Science Foundation's 2013 International Visualization Challenge in the Games and Apps Category.
 An Eyewire image by Alex Norton won MIT's 2014 Koch Image Gallery Competition.
 Eyewire named one of Discover Magazines Top 100 Science Stories of 2013.
 Eyewire named top citizen science project of 2013 by SciStarter.
 Eyewire won Biovision's World Life Sciences Forum Catalyzer Prize on March 26, 2013.
 Eyewire named to top 10 citizen science projects of 2013 by PLoS.

Eyewire has been featured by Wired, Nature blog SpotOn, Forbes, Scientific American, and NPR.

References

External links

Human-based computation games
Neuroimaging
2012 video games
Browser games
Video games developed in the United States
Citizen science